Mother Goose is a figure in the literature of fairy-tales and nursery rhymes.

Mother Goose may also refer to:

Arts, entertainment, and media

Literature
Mother Goose and Grimm, an American comic strip
Mother Goose in Prose, a children's stories collection by L. Frank Baum
Mother Goose, pen name of Jeannette Walworth (1835-1918)

Music

Groups
Mother Goose (band), a 1970s New Zealand band

Works
 "Mother Goose",  song on the album Aqualung by the progressive rock band Jethro Tull
 "Mother Goose", a 1998 song by horror rock band Rosemary's Billygoat
"Ma mère l'Oye", a piece of music composed by Maurice Ravel

Other uses in arts, entertainment, and media 
 "Mother Goose", the nickname of Jim Goose, a character in the movie Mad Max (1979) 
 Mixed-Up Mother Goose, a series of edutainment computer games
 Mother Goose Award, an annual award presented to "the most exciting newcomer to British children's book illustration"
 Mother Goose Club, an educational nursery school program and Youtube channel

Other uses
Mother Goose (horse), a racehorse
Chris Pitman (born 1961), American rock keyboardist, nicknamed "Mother Goose"
Mother Goose Lake, in Alaska, United States
Mother Goose Playskool and Gradeschool, a system of schools in the Philippines

See also
 Goose (disambiguation)